Peter Duerden (born 5 June 1945, in Burnley) is an English retired-Canadian association football defender who played professionally in the North American Soccer League and the Major Indoor Soccer League. He also served as an assistant coach with teams in both leagues.

Player

Professional
In 1964, Duerden moved from England to Canada where he signed with the Toronto Metros of the North American Soccer League. He began the 1972 season with Toronto before moving to the Montreal Olympique during the season. In late 1973, he played in the National Soccer League with Toronto First Portuguese. He then played a handful of games for the New York Arrows during the 1978-1979 Major Indoor Soccer League season.

National team
In 1971, Duerden played three games with the Canadian Olympic soccer team. That year he also played eight games for the Canadian Pan American Games soccer team.

Coach
In 1978, Duerden was an assistant coach with the Rochester Lancers of the North American Soccer League. In 1978, he became an assistant coach-player with the New York Arrows who borrowed much of their roster from the Lancers. He returned to Rochester in the same capacity as an assistant coach for the 1979 season. On July 13, 1979, he was dismissed from his post by the head coach Dragan Popović.

In 1980, the Denver Avalanche of MISL hired Duerden as an assistant coach.

References

External links
NASL/MISL stats

1945 births
Canadian soccer players
English footballers
English expatriate footballers
Footballers from Burnley
Living people
Major Indoor Soccer League (1978–1992) coaches
Major Indoor Soccer League (1978–1992) players
Montreal Olympique players
New York Arrows players
North American Soccer League (1968–1984) players
Toronto Blizzard (1971–1984) players
Association football defenders
Pan American Games competitors for Canada
Footballers at the 1971 Pan American Games
English expatriate sportspeople in Canada
Expatriate soccer players in Canada
English emigrants to Canada
Canadian expatriate soccer players
Expatriate soccer players in the United States
Canadian expatriate sportspeople in the United States
Canadian National Soccer League players
Toronto First Portuguese players